Rodolfo "Rudy" Escalera (also known as Rodolfo Escalera Vizcaíno; June 1, 1929 – January 25, 2000) was a Mexican-American artist. Among other works, he created collectible plates for the 1984 Summer Olympics, which became "The Official Gift of the 1984 Olympics". Escalera also created a collectible plate for the 1986 World cup hosted in Mexico. Escalera's primary medium was oils on canvas. The majority of his works are based in realism as he did not like abstract painting.

Biography 
.

In 1980 Escalera entered into the plate collector business. He mainly created children's plates and was featured in magazines such as The Plate Collector.   This medium led to him applying for the licensing right to be an official licensee for the 1984 Summer Olympics. He was awarded the license and commissioned to create nine paintings, depicting many of the olympic events. The paintings were converted into high quality collectible porcelain plates and sold, in limited edition quantities, to the general public. The plates were also used by the Olympic committee as the "official gift" and presented to all of the visiting dignitaries throughout the world. After the Olympics Escalera was commissioned to create a painting for the 1986 World Cup, held in Mexico City.

In 1988 Escalera Moved to an area near his home town in Lerdo, Durango Mexico. Upon his return, a neighboring city, Torreon, Coahuila awarded Escalera with an official plaque from the city recognizing him as Valor Lagunero, an award the city offers to citizens who have had significant accomplishments throughout their lifetime. Lerdo, Durango, awarded him the designation of Ciudadano Distinguido or "very distinguished citizen". Escalera’s home town of Gomez Palacio, Durango named the largest showroom at "La Casa De La Cultura" (The House of Culture) after him at a dedication promoting art in all of its varying formats. In 1994 Escalera was diagnosed with cancer and died six years later on January 25, 2000.

Notable owners of Escalera paintings 
Escalera’s painting entitled The Mailman was donated to Hugh Hefner in 2003 by Escalera's sons Robert and Rudy Escalera. The painting is on display at the Playboy Mansion. This painting features a mailman reading the first edition of Playboy magazine. He is sitting on some steps surrounded by women who are behind and posing flirtatiously.

After the death of country music star Marty Robbins, Escalera presented Robbins' widow with a painting named after and depicting her late husband. The painting was presented ceremoniously onstage at the Grand Ole Opry in honor of the famous singer.

Escalera's was the only Olympic project endorsed by Los Angeles Mayor Tom Bradley. At a meeting with Escalera, Bradley commented: "We are deeply honored that Rudy Escalera, one of Los Angeles's outstanding artists, has been licensed to paint the official Licensed Commemorative plate collection for our 1984 Olympic games." 250 sets of plates were created for dignitaries attending the games including Mayor Bradley, President Ronald Reagan and the Prince of Wales.

List of paintings 
Rodolfo Escalera Vizcaíno created more than 70 works of art including five masterpieces that took him approximately 20 years to complete.

Notes

External links 
 http://www.buzzle.com/articles/famous-mexican-artists.html
 http://www.elsiglodetorreon.com.mx/noticia/268447.recorrido-por-la-historia-y-el-arte.html
 http://www.vvdailypress.com/news/father_3961___article.html/escalera_art.html
 http://www.elsiglodetorreon.com.mx/noticia/70051.al-otro-lado-del-puente.html

Artists from Durango
People from Gómez Palacio, Durango
2000 deaths
1929 births
20th-century indigenous painters of the Americas
20th-century American painters
American male painters
20th-century Mexican painters
20th-century American male artists
Mexican male painters
American artists of Mexican descent
20th-century Mexican male artists